Termo may refer to:

 A vacuum flask
 Termo, California, USA
 Leonard Termo (?–2012), American character actor